Reid and Forbes was a firm of Scottish architects specialising in school buildings in central and southern Scotland from 1920 to 1964. They had a very distinctive style and many of their buildings are now listed buildings.

History
The firm was a partnership between George Reid (1893-1984) and James Smith Forbes. It had early collaborations with Reginald Fairlie.

Reid was articled to the architect’s firm Scott Morton & Co in 1910 to 1914 and attended Edinburgh College of Art during the same period. During this period he was also at various points seconded to Robert Lorimer, George Washington Browne and James Bow Dunn.

After World War I Reid joined with James Smith Forbes and Reginald Fairlie in a competition for local authority housing between Edinburgh and Portobello, now known as Northfield. Little is known of Forbes other than his name is sometimes reversed to James Forbes Smith and that even after the dissolution of their architectural partnership Forbes lodged in Fairlie’s house. Reid probably met Forbes through Fairlie rather than the other way around.

They had strong Roman Catholic connections and over and above their many school commissions they also were involved in several church projects.

Their heydays were clearly in the 1930s and following World War II they had far less commissions.

The company died with the death of Reid in 1984.

Principal Works
see

Housing in Moffat (with Reginald Fairlie (1921)
Coldstream Secondary School (1922)
Housing in Tranent (1922-3)
Housing in Northfield, Edinburgh (1922-3) (with Reginald Fairlie)
Innerleithen Primary and Secondary Schools (1922-3)
Richmond Congregational Church in Niddrie, Edinburgh (1923)
St John’s RC Primary School, Portobello, Edinburgh (1924)
Jedburgh Grammar School north-west wing (1926)
Gatehouse to Edinburgh Castle (incorporating Bruce and Wallace Memorial) (1928)
Leith Academy (with rich Egyptian detailing) (1928)
Morebattle Primary School (1931)
Inverness High School (1932)
Prep School and Science Block for George Heriot’s School (1933)
Kelso Academy (1933)
Niddrie Church and Halls (1934)
Trinity Primary School in Hawick (1934)
Niddrie Marischal Junior Secondary School (1935)
Hobkirk Primary School (1936)
Chirnside Central School (1937)
Wilkie’s Department Store, Shandwick Place, Edinburgh (1937)
Moredun Church and Halls, Edinburgh (1951)
Royal High School, Edinburgh (1964)

References

Dictionary of Scottish Architects: Reid and Forbes

Scottish architects
Architecture firms of Scotland